The Symphony No. 6, Op. 343, is a work for orchestra by French composer Darius Milhaud. The piece was written in 1955 at the request of Charles Munch, for the seventy-fifth anniversary of the Boston Symphony Orchestra. This work is not to be confused with Milhaud's Chamber Symphony No. 6, op. 79 (1923).

Milhaud's Sixth Symphony has four movements and a total running time of about 30 minutes. The titles of the movements, as descriptive of their character as of tempo, are as follows:
 Calme et tendre (approx. 9')
 Tumultueux (approx. 6')
 Lent et doux (approx. 8'45")
 Joyeux et robuste (approx. 6'30")

This symphony is published by Heugel & Cie.

Recordings 
 a stereo recording of the composer himself conducting the Louisville Orchestra, re-released in 2004 on the First Edition label 
 a 1992 all-digital recording by Alun Francis and the Radio-Sinfonieorchester Basel, part of a boxed set of Milhaud's Symphonies No. 1-12 on CPO
 a 1997 all-digital recording by Michel Plasson and the Toulouse Capitole Orchestra on Deutsche Grammophon

References

External links 
Video - Darius Milhaud - Symphony No. 6 (1 of 2) (15:05).
Video - Darius Milhaud - Symphony No. 6 (2 of 2) (15:18).

Symphony 06
1955 compositions